Historia is a peer-reviewed academic journal specialising in the history of the Americas and Chile. It was established in 1961 and its first director was Jaime Eyzaguirre. The first editorial committee included Ricardo Krebs, Gonzalo Vial, Gabriel Guarda, Armando de Ramón, Julio González and Carlos Oviedo. Javier González acted as secretary. Apart from original articles the journal includes a bibliography of any history publication about Chile or written by a Chilean in the period that precedes the journal deem relevant.

External links

References

History of the Americas journals
Biannual journals
Publications established in 1961
Pontifical Catholic University of Chile academic journals
Spanish-language journals
1961 establishments in Chile